Her Sacrifice is a 1926 American silent drama film directed by Wilfred Lucas and starring Gaston Glass, Bryant Washburn and Gladys Brockwell. It is based on an 1871 play by the Mexican writer Manuel Acuña.

Synopsis
After discovering that he has won a scholarship to study painting in Paris, a young man an proposes to his girlfriend. She is reluctant because of a secret in her past, but her persuades her to accompany him to France where she models to augment his funds. He wins a large prize for his work and the couple look set to return home in triumph. However, when the man who once seduced her appears and threatens her happiness she attempts suicide. The story climaxes in a duel between the two men.

Cast
 Gaston Glass as David Orland
 Bryant Washburn as 	Donald Gorham
 Herbert Rawlinson as 	James Romaine
 Gladys Brockwell as 	Mary Cullen
 Wilfred Lucas as 	Edwin Ramsey
 Ligia de Golconda as Margarita Darlow 
 Gene Crosby as Wayne Landis
 Hector V. Sarno as Prof. Oliver 
 Charles A. Post as Ambassador Dupree 
 Barbara Tennant as Madame Dupree
 Marshall Ruth as Cyril

References

Bibliography
 Connelly, Robert B. The Silents: Silent Feature Films, 1910-36, Volume 40, Issue 2. December Press, 1998.
 Munden, Kenneth White. The American Film Institute Catalog of Motion Pictures Produced in the United States, Part 1. University of California Press, 1997.

External links
 

1926 films
1926 drama films
1920s English-language films
American silent feature films
Silent American drama films
Films directed by Wilfred Lucas
American black-and-white films
Novels set in Paris
1920s American films